Blair Young (born 5 April 1971 in Brisbane) is a retired Australian athlete specialising in the 400 metres hurdles. He represented his country at the 2000 Summer Olympics and the 2001 World Championships reaching the semifinals on both occasions.

His personal bests are 49.08 seconds in the 400 metres hurdles and 45.94 seconds in the flat 400 metres, both set in 2000.

Competition record

References

1971 births
Living people
Athletes from Brisbane
Australian male hurdlers
Olympic athletes of Australia
Athletes (track and field) at the 2000 Summer Olympics
World Athletics Championships athletes for Australia
Competitors at the 2001 Goodwill Games
20th-century Australian people
21st-century Australian people